Sammari Lal is an Indian politician and an MLA elected from Kanke block of Jharkhand state as a member of Bharatiya Janata Party 2019.

References

Living people
21st-century Indian politicians
Lok Sabha members from Jharkhand
People from Jharkhand
Date of birth missing (living people)
Place of birth missing (living people)
Year of birth missing (living people)
Jharkhand MLAs 2019–2024